Donald Parham Jr. (born August 16, 1997) is an American football tight end for the Los Angeles Chargers of the National Football League (NFL). He played college football at Stetson, and signed with the Detroit Lions as an undrafted free agent in 2019.

College career
Parham played college football at Stetson. During his senior season, he had 85 receptions for 1,319 yards and 13 touchdowns.

Professional career

Detroit Lions 
On May 10, 2019, Parham signed with the Detroit Lions after going undrafted in the 2019 NFL Draft. He was waived on May 12, 2019.

Washington Redskins 
He signed with the Washington Redskins on June 7, 2019, after a minicamp tryout. Parham was waived on August 31, 2019, but re-signed to their practice squad on September 12. He was released on September 17, 2019.

Dallas Renegades 
In the 2020 XFL Draft, he was selected in the ninth round by the Dallas Renegades. In his second game versus the Los Angeles Wildcats, Parham made five catches for 76 yards and a touchdown. He had his contract terminated when the league suspended operations on April 10, 2020.

Los Angeles Chargers

2020 season 
Parham signed with the Los Angeles Chargers on April 14, 2020.
During his first game in week 4 against the Tampa Bay Buccaneers, Parham recorded his first career reception, a 19-yard touchdown pass from rookie quarterback Justin Herbert, during the 38–31 loss.

2021 season 
While attempting to catch a pass during a week 15 game against the Kansas City Chiefs, Parham dove for a ball in the back of the end zone.  Without contacting an opponent he landed on his elbow and then rolled onto his back, which caused his head to make contact with the ground and go unconscious and demonstrated a fencing pose with rigid arms. After about 10 minutes, with arms still rigid and hands shaking, he was taken to Harbor–UCLA Medical Center and was said to be in stable condition, undergoing tests for a head injury. He was placed on injured reserve on December 25.

2022 season 
On November 5, 2022, Parham was placed on injured reserve. He was activated on December 17.

NFL statistics

References

External links

Los Angeles Chargers bio
Stetson Hatters bio

1997 births
Living people
American football tight ends
Stetson Hatters football players
Dallas Renegades players
Detroit Lions players
Los Angeles Chargers players
Players of American football from Florida
Sportspeople from Lakeland, Florida
Washington Redskins players
African-American players of American football
21st-century African-American sportspeople